Shirshi is a village in Kokan on the banks of the Jagbudi River. The village falls under the jurisdiction of the Khed Taluka of Ratnagiri.

Shirshi is also located in Ratnagiri district of Maharashtra and is also known for Alphonso Mango, as well as seasonal fruits like as jackfruit, cashewnut, jamun, chickoo, and others.

Main farming is rice, and 3 types of grain (in Kokni language also we know as Toor Dal).

There are numerous residential blocks. They are known as Mohallas and Vadis, and include:
Varachi Vadi
Khalchi Vadi
Madhli Vadi
Mukadam Vadi
Chauan Vadi
Patil Vadi
Gurav Vadi
Chinkate Vadi
Buddha Vadi
Mali Vadi

Location
The village has a view from the Konkan Railway bridge across the river, with a landscape of green paddy fields stretching for around a mile, before the start of the hills. The village consists of around 300 houses, almost all of them lying on the hilly lands, thus providing resistance towards heavy rains and seasonal floods.

History
Not much is known about the history of the village, however when the land near the local graveyard was levelled with a bulldozer in an attempt to make use of the land for a better public convenience, very old (reported to be of many centuries old) household items were recovered. The fairy tales (as told to the kids by the elder generations through centuries) reveal a long historic trade links between the localities' and the outside world (specially the Arabs). This is largely due to the existence of the village in the close proximity of the Arabian Sea.

Facilities
Compared to the other villages in India, Shirshi (and almost all of the nearby villages) enjoy the modern day facilities of Media, Telecommunication, Television, Internet etc. When the telephones were first introduced to Indians in the mid 80s the then Sarpanch of the village got the first telephone line connection of the village. Similar is the case with the televisions. The village has local cable connections as well as the DISH TV networks (as provided by TATA, Airtel and Reliance). All of the major Mobile phone operators have their connectivity in Shirshi, while MTNL and TATA Indicom provide the landline telephone facility. Banking facility is provided by the country's largest bank, the State Bank of India. Shirshi has a local Post Office which collects as well as distributes the local post. It also manages the Postal Savings Accounts of the villagers. The local posts are transferred to the Karji Post Office on a daily basis. The Taluka Post Office is located in Khed.

Education
Shirshi has got an Urdu Primary School (till Std 7th) and a Marathi High School (till SSC). Apart from these two local schools, numerous other schools and educational bodies exists within a short distance. Students completing their Primary School in Urdu medium usually go for their higher education at the Adarsh High School in Karjee, Haji Mukadam School in Khed and L.T.T English Meduim School and Jounior Collage in Khed or some prefer the National School in the nearby village Savnas. There is also a Marathi medium High School in Shiv, just across the Jagbudi river.
Institutes in the town of Khed provide the Junior and the Degree college education. The DBJ College in Chiplun is also popular for the post school education. Recently, a major dental college The Yogita Dental College (www.yogitadentalcollege.com) has come up in Khed which has provided a real boost for the students opting for the dental education.

Transportation

Air

Railways
Major trains going towards Mumbai and the southern region have their halts at the Khed railway station. The famous Dadar-Ratnagiri Passenger train has one full boogie reserved for the people boarding from Khed.

Road
The village is connected to the Khed town and hence to the NH-17 (Mumbai to Goa) through the local regional road (first it connects to Khed-Dapoli SH-104 and this road then connects to the NH-17 at Bharne Naka).
State Transport buses famously called the ST buses (locally pronounced as 'aeshtee') run frequently to and from the Khed ST Depot. Direct buses are available for Mumbai, Pune, Thane, Kalyan, Kolhapur, Ratnagiri, Miraj, Vitthalwadi, Chiplun and many other nearby towns like Dapoli, Mandangad etc. from the Khed depot.
Auto Rickshaws are in abundance. With the two wheeler industry in full swing youngsters enjoy their conveyance through the motorbikes.

Notable people
The people of Shirshi have a distinction of showing their presence in some of the Maharashtra's well known cities like Mumbai, Thane, Pune, Bhiwandi, Jalgaon, Khamgaon, Jalna, Akole, Latur and Solapur. Village people also live in Kuwait, Dubai, KSA, Qatar, Oman.

Majority of the people have their surnames as Hamdulay (or Hamdule), Mukadam, Chinkate, Patil and Chauhan. The other surnames include Siddique, Mandlekar, Walapkar, Tambe and Mali.

See also
 Arabian Sea
 Ashti, Khed
 Bahirwali
 Bhoste
 Karji
 Kondivali
 Ratnagiri
 Savnas

References

Villages in Ratnagiri district